Khatmabad (also Romanized as Khatmābād) is a village in Sarbanan Rural District, in the Central District of Zarand County, Kerman Province, Iran. At the 2006 census, its population was 290, in 74 families.

References 

Populated places in Zarand County